Chaetopyrena is a genus of fungi belonging to the family Didymellaceae.

The species of this genus are found in Europe and Northern America.

Species:

Chaetopyrena cerletti 
Chaetopyrena chaetostoma 
Chaetopyrena galii 
Chaetopyrena hederae-helicis 
Chaetopyrena hesperidium 
Chaetopyrena myxosperma 
Chaetopyrena penicillata 
Chaetopyrena poae 
Chaetopyrena quercicola 
Chaetopyrena rumicina 
Chaetopyrena ubrizsyi 
Chaetopyrena ulmicola 
Chaetopyrena xerophila

References

Pleosporales
Dothideomycetes genera